Stormwarrior is a German power metal band that was formed in 1998 by vocalist and guitar player Lars Ramcke and drummer Andre Schumann, adding later in the same year guitarist Scott Bolter and bass player Tim Zienert. The members of Stormwarrior draw their musical influences from the 80s heavy metal scene including such fellow German bands as Helloween and Running Wild.

Their debut full-length album Stormwarrior, released in 2002, and their 2004 follow up Northern Rage were both produced by Kai Hansen of Helloween and Gamma Ray fame who also contributed vocal and guitar performances on some songs. Much of Stormwarrior's lyrical content deals with Viking-related themes.

Members

Current 

 Lars Ramcke – vocals (1998–present), guitars (1998–2005, 2006–present)
 Björn Daigger – guitars (2015–present)
 Yenz Leonhardt – bass (2007–2017, 2019–present)
 Falko Reshöft – drums (2002–2009, 2019–present)

Former 

 Tim Zienert – bass (1998–2001)
 Gabriele Palermo – bass (2001–2002)
 Andre Schumann – drums (1998–2002)
 Scott Bölter – guitars (1998–2002)
 Jussi Zimmermann – bass (2002–2007)
 David Wiczorek – guitars (2003–2006)
 Alex Guth – guitars (2005–2014)
 Hendrik Thiesbrummel – drums (2009–2013)
 Jörg Uken – drums (2013–2018)
 Connor Andreszka – bass (2017–2018)

Discography

Albums 

 Stormwarrior (2002)
 Northern Rage (2004)
 Heading Northe (2008)
 Heathen Warrior (2011)
 Thunder & Steele (2014)
 Norsemen (2019)

Demos / EPs 

 Metal Victory (1998)
 Barbaric Steel (1999)
 Possessed by Metal (2001)
 Spikes and Leather (2002)
 Heavy Metal Fire (2003)
 Odens Krigare (2004)

Live 
 At Foreign Shores (2006)

See also 
List of power metal bands
Viking metal

References

External links 

 

Musical groups established in 1998
German power metal musical groups
German speed metal musical groups